Jake Evans (born June 2, 1996) is a Canadian professional ice hockey player for the  Montreal Canadiens of the National Hockey League (NHL). He was selected in the seventh round, 207th overall by the Canadiens in the 2014 NHL Entry Draft.

Personal life
Evans was born on June 2, 1996, in Toronto, Ontario, Canada to parents Wayne and Marilyn. His mother is a family physician with a practice in Mississauga and his father is a salesman. He also grew up with an older brother, Matthew, who works in finance and two cousins who played ice hockey at Cornell University. As a child, Evans played piano and earned his Grade 7 Royal Conservatory certificate.

Playing career
Evans played for the University of Notre Dame in the NCAA Big Ten Conference and was signed following his senior season with Fighting Irish to a two-year, entry-level contract with the Montreal Canadiens on April 9, 2018. On February 10, 2020, Evans scored his first NHL goal in the Canadiens' 3–2 loss to the Arizona Coyotes.

On June 2, 2021, Evans received a hard open ice hit from Winnipeg Jets player Mark Scheifele during Game 1 of the second round of the 2021 playoffs, that left him stretchered off the ice.  As a result he missed the remaining games against the Winnipeg Jets and the entire semi-final series against the Vegas Golden Knights. He returned as a replacement for Joel Armia during the 2021 Stanley Cup Final against the Tampa Bay Lightning. Scheifele was suspended for four games following the hit.

On October 3, 2021, Evans signed a three-year, $5.1 million contract extension with the Canadiens.

Career statistics

Awards and honours

References

External links
 

1996 births
Living people
Canadian ice hockey centres
Laval Rocket players
Montreal Canadiens draft picks
Montreal Canadiens players
Notre Dame Fighting Irish men's ice hockey players
Ice hockey people from Toronto
St. Michael's Buzzers players